Kolsass is a municipality in the district Innsbruck-Land in the Austrian state of Tyrol located about 17 km east of Innsbruck. The location was first mentioned as „Quolesazz or Cholsasz" in 1050.

Population

References

External links
 

Cities and towns in Innsbruck-Land District